Eugene Fodor (October 14, 1905 – February 18, 1991) was a Hungarian-American writer of travel literature.

Biography
Fodor was born in Léva, Hungary (then Austria-Hungary; now Levice, Slovakia). Noting that travel guides of his time were boring, he wrote a guide to Europe, On the Continent—The Entertaining Travel Annual, which was published in 1936 by Francis Aldor, Aldor Publications, London and was reprinted in 2011 by Random House as an e-book.

In his youth, Fodor studied political economics at the Sorbonne and at the University of Grenoble in France. Fodor joined the US Army in 1942 during World War II, and was transferred to the Office of Strategic Services, serving in Europe. His spy status was kept a secret until nearly thirty years later, when it was revealed by E. Howard Hunt. He married Vlasta Zobel, a Czech national, in 1948.

In 1949, he founded Fodor's in Paris, France. He created Fodor Modern Guides, operating initially from Paris but moving to Connecticut in 1964. He lived there until his death in 1991.

References

 
 

1905 births
1991 deaths
People from Levice
American travel writers
Hungarian emigrants to the United States
United States Army personnel of World War II
20th-century American non-fiction writers
20th-century American male writers
American male non-fiction writers
United States Army officers
People of the Office of Strategic Services
People from Litchfield, Connecticut
Ritchie Boys
University of Paris alumni
Hungarian expatriates in France